The Seychelles gulper shark (Centrophorus seychellorum) is a species of fish in the family Centrophoridae found in Alphonse island in Seychelles. This species is distinguished by having large tip of snout to first dorsal distance of 34% TL; first dorsal fin high (7% TL); second dorsal fin base long (9.8% TL); long snout (12.2% TL); uniformly grey with tip and the trailing edge of dorsal fins blackish. It is one of 11 described species in the genus Centrophorus.

References

Seychelles gulper shark
Fauna of Seychelles
Seychelles gulper shark